Nero-Mer Airport  is an airport serving Grand-Béréby, Côte d'Ivoire.

See also
Transport in Côte d'Ivoire

References

 OurAirports - Grand Bereby
 Great Circle Mapper - Grand Bereby
 Hôtel La Baie des Sirènes
 Google Earth

Airports in Ivory Coast
Buildings and structures in Bas-Sassandra District
San-Pédro Region